Cherniakhiv or Chernyakhiv may refer to several places in Ukraine;

 Cherniakhiv, Kyiv Oblast, a village in Obukhiv Raion, Kyiv Oblast
 Cherniakhiv, Rivne Oblast, a village in Ostroh Raion, Rivne Oblast
 Cherniakhiv, Zhytomyr Oblast, a town (urban-type settlement) in Cherniakhiv Raion, Zhytomyr Oblast

See also
 Chernyakhov culture, historic archaeological culture around the village of Cherniakhiv, Kyiv Oblast
 Chernyakhovsk, a city of Kaliningrad Oblast (historic Eastern Prussia) named after Ivan Chernyakhovsky
 Ivan Chernyakhovsky, a Soviet general from Ukraine